Desheng is a town under the administration of Qinggang County, Heilongjiang, China. , it administers the following twelve villages:
Ronghua Village
Longsheng Village
Yong'an Village
Jinglong Village
Fugui Village
Tongli Village
Yingxian Village
Tongshun Village
Hengsheng Village
Wanghai Village
Jiefang Village
Yichang Village

References 

Township-level divisions of Heilongjiang
Qinggang County